Capital Radio is a London-based radio station that launched in 1973, now part of the Capital radio network.

Capital Radio or Radio Capital may also refer to:

Radio stations

Europe
 Capital (radio network), a group of radio stations operating across the United Kingdom
 Capital Radio (pirate), a pirate radio station operating off the Dutch coast in 1970
 Radio Capital, an Italian national radio station
 Capital Radio, a radio station broadcasting in Spain
 Capital Radio, the original name of Dublin commercial station FM104
 Capital Radio Malta, a defunct radio station that broadcast from the Republic of Malta

Other places
 Capital Radio Network, an Australian network of radio stations
 Capital Radio 93.8, a radio station broadcasting in Cyprus on 93.8 MHz
 Capital Radio Malawi, a national radio station broadcasting in Malawi
 Capital Radio Sierra Leone, a radio station broadcasting in Sierra Leone on 104.9 MHz
 Capital Radio 604, a radio station broadcasting in South Africa on 604 kHz
 XEITE-AM, in Mexico City, known as Radio Capital
 Radio Capital (Dhaka), Bangladesh

Other uses
Capital Radio One, or Capital Radio, a song and EP by The Clash
 "Radio Capital", a song by La Vida Bohème from the 2010 album Nuestra

See also
 Capital FM (disambiguation)